Pettandarulu ( Rulers) is a 1970 Telugu-language revolutionary film, produced by U. Visweswara Rao under the Jyothi Cine Syndicate banner, and directed by C. S. Rao. The film starred N. T. Rama Rao, Savitri, Shobhan Babu, Vijaya Nirmala with music composed by K. V. Mahadevan.

Plot
The film begins in a village where its president Jagannadham commits atrocities as a dictator with Sarpanch Butchaiah, Munsif Achaiah, Lakshmipathi, and a clerk Govindaiah. Bhushayya a Samaritan, is Jagannadham's ex-brother-in-law. At present, Bhushayya lives with his second wife Ranganayakamma and two sons, Suryam progeny of his first wife, and Chandram. Since Suryam is the nephew of Jagannadham, he couples up with his daughter Lakshmi and under his nurture, he turns into debauchery. Chandram is an upright man, who struggles for the welfare of the village and thus becomes an enemy of Jagannadham. Hence, Jagannadham intrigues to eliminate him who has been rescued by doctor Rohini and they fall in love. Meanwhile, Jagannathan keeps an evil eye on Sarada Bhushayya's sister-in-law's daughter, and spoils her match, whereupon Jagannadham & Bhushayya come to blows. A begrudging Jagannadham foments Suryam against his father, which leads to Bhushayya's death. Chandram then hands over the entire property to his brother and quits the house. Afterward, he unites the villagers and forms an association against the evildoers. At the same time, Mohan a Vigilance officer, arrives and marries Sarada. Now, with the support of Chandram, he gathers all the pieces of evidence against Jagannatham. Enraged, Jagannatham kidnaps Mohan & Rohini and burns away the yearly yield of the village. All the villagers then burst out in revolt, including Suryam as a reformed person. At last, Chandram conquers the baddies and rescues Mohan & Rohini. Finally, the movie ends on a happy note with the wedding of Chandram and Rohini.

Cast

N. T. Rama Rao as Chandram 
Savitri as Lakshmi 
Shobhan Babu as Mohan
Vijaya Nirmala as Dr. Rohini Devi
V. Nagayya as Bhushaiah 
Nagabhushanam as Jaganatham 
Relangi as Madman / Police Officer 
Satyanarayana as Kotaiah 
Prabhakar Reddy as Suryam 
Dhulipala as Govindaiah
Mukkamala as Sarpanch Bhuchaiah
Allu Ramalingaiah as Lakshmipathi
Raja Babu as Veeranjaneyulu  
Rao Gopal Rao as Munusabu Achaiah
Hemalatha as Ranganayakamma 
Rama Prabha as Sarasa
Vijayalalitha as Nagamani
Jyothi Lakshmi as item number
Sadhya Rani as Sarada 
Jhansi as Nirada
Baby Rani as Raja

Soundtrack

The music was composed by  K. V. Mahadevan, and was released by Audio Company.

References

Indian drama films
Films directed by C. S. Rao
Films scored by K. V. Mahadevan
1970s Telugu-language films